Jaime Asensio de la Fuente (born 7 October 1978, in Madrid), commonly known as Asen, is a Spanish retired footballer who played as a striker.

External links

1978 births
Living people
Footballers from Madrid
Spanish footballers
Association football forwards
La Liga players
Segunda División players
Segunda División B players
Tercera División players
Atlético Madrid B players
AD Alcorcón footballers
Getafe CF footballers
CF Extremadura footballers
Córdoba CF players
Albacete Balompié players
Recreativo de Huelva players
CF Rayo Majadahonda players